Ringmaster is the second studio album by American hip hop group Insane Clown Posse, released on March 8, 1994, by Psychopathic Records.  Recording sessions for the album took place in 1993 at The Tempermill Studio. The album is the second Joker's Card in the group's Dark Carnival mythology. The album's lyrics describe the leader of the Carnival, who serves as one of the judges of one's soul in the afterlife, as being created from the listener's own evils.

The album was the first Insane Clown Posse album which was composed solely by producer Mike E. Clark, who would work with the group throughout much of their career. It features guest appearances by Capitol E and Jumpsteady. Ringmaster was reissued by Island Records in 1998 and earned a gold certification by the Recording Industry Association of America (RIAA). In 2004 the original version also earned a gold certification by the RIAA.

Conception

Background
Following a dream by group member Joseph Bruce in which "spirits in a traveling carnival appeared to him", Insane Clown Posse created the mythology of the Dark Carnival. The Carnival, a metaphoric limbo in which the lives of the dead await to be judged, was planned to be elaborated through a series of stories called Joker's Cards, each of which offers a specific lesson designed to change the "evil ways" of listeners before "the end consumes us all."

Following the release of the first Joker's Card, Carnival of Carnage, the group began to build a local following. To increase interest and popularity, they produced a mass amount of promotional material such as demo packages, flyers, and fan club newsletters. The group also released their first EP, Beverly Kills 50187, in 1993. When they felt the building anticipation for the second Joker's Card, the duo began work on Ringmaster.

Recording
Ringmaster was recorded at The Tempermill Studio in Ferndale, Michigan with Mike E. Clark producing and mastering the album. Jumpsteady and Capitol E appear as guests on the album.

Joker's Cards
Ringmaster is the second Joker's Card in Insane Clown Posse's Dark Carnival concept album series. The Dark Carnival is a concept of the afterlife in which souls are sent to a form of limbo while waiting to be sent to heaven or hell based on their individual actions. These concepts are related by Insane Clown Posse in a series of albums called the six Joker's Cards. Each of the six Joker's Cards relate to a specific character—an entity of the Dark Carnival—that tries to "save the human soul" by showing the wicked inside of one's self.

Ringmaster is the overseer of the Carnival of Carnage. He is created through one's own sins, and is one of several who will judge whether a soul is worthy to enter heaven or doomed to eternal hell. The Card issues a warning against the neglect of our basic morals.

Music

Samples
"My Fun House" samples the bass line of the song "Bullet in the Head" by Rage Against the Machine.
"Who Asked You" contains a small part of the song "Nobody's Fault" by Aerosmith. "Get Off Me Dog" samples Spice 1 "Trigga Happy" from 187 He Wrote.

The psychedelic rock band Gong track "You can't kill me" is sampled on "For The Maggots", whose opening flute note comes from Gong's "Bambooji", while the melody of "Ringmaster's Word" comes from the closing notes of Gong's "The Pot Head Pixies", as well as "The Dead One", which samples Gong's "Selene" and "Who Asked You" which samples the flute from "Oily Way".

Lyricism
When writing lyrics for the album, the group realized that they were defining the direction for future Joker's Cards and what their group could become. Joseph Bruce explains that they "wanted to make a statement, to direct our energy. We wanted to mix comedy and horror, and hold it up like a mirror to a city full of gangsters and scrubs like us." According to the group's mythology, the Ringmaster is the leader of the Carnival of Carnage. He leads "the phantoms of the dead" that take the form of the Carnival. The creatures fiercely tear doomed souls from their living bodies and drag them down into Hell. The album tells morality tales as the Ringmaster character takes the listener through exhibits of the Carnival, as in such songs as "Murder Go Round", "Wagon Wagon", and "House of Mirrors."

Release and promotion
To help promote the album, Insane Clown Posse created the comic book Wicked Clownz featuring themselves and the Ringmaster character. The comic was written by Bruce, illustrated by Joseph Utsler, and printed in Canada. The cover of the comic was illustrated by Justin Felix.  Seven weeks before the release of the album, the pressing company produced 10,000 CDs and 10,000 cassettes that were filled with misprints. The company doubled the groups order for free to make up for the mistake, and presented the group with a total of 40,000 units.

In 1995, Insane Clown Posse signed a contract with the short-lived Jive Records subsidiary label Battery Records, which funded the production of a music video for the song "Chicken Huntin'". Joseph and Robert Bruce developed their own concept for the video, but the director changed their plans, and the final concept instead featured Insane Clown Posse performing actions which Joseph Bruce later described as "[Some of] the stupidest thing[s] I had ever heard of." Because the group and the label were disappointed with the video, it was not publicly released at the time, although a snippet of it later appeared on Stranglemania in 1996 and finally the full video was released on Psychopathic: The Videos in 2007.

Reception

Ringmaster sold 40,000 units locally, and, following a national release, became the first Insane Clown Posse album to be certified Gold. In The Great Rock Discography, Martin Charles Strong gave the album four out of ten stars. The album received one star out of five in The New Rolling Stone Album Guide. AllMusic reviewer Stephen Thomas Erlewine said that Ringmaster has "more focus on [the] Ringmaster [character], which means that the album hits harder and makes a bigger impression."

Legacy
Ringmaster's popularity enabled Insane Clown Posse to sell out larger nightclubs across their hometown of Detroit, Michigan such as St. Andrews Hall and the State Theatre. Because members Joseph Bruce and Joseph Utsler made reference to the Detroit-produced soft drink Faygo in their songs, they "figured it would be cool to have some on stage with [them]." During a concert in 1993, Bruce threw an open bottle of Faygo at a row of concertgoers who were giving them the finger. After receiving a positive response, Bruce and Utsler have since continued to spray Faygo onto audiences. A subsequent national tour increased sales of the album, earning Ringmaster a gold certification.

Jive Records produced a remix of the song "Chicken Huntin'" which was rejected by Insane Clown Posse, leading the group to produce its own remix, which appeared on their next album Riddle Box. The song "Mr. Johnson's Head" was re-recorded in 1997 and was intended to be featured on the group's fourth studio album The Great Milenko. The idea was later scrapped due to their label at the time, Hollywood Records, rejecting the track for its violent lyrics, as they would with several of the group's other songs. The re-recording was released on Insane Clown Posse's compilation album Forgotten Freshness Volumes 1 & 2. Later that year, the duo signed with Island/PolyGram Records, which reissued Ringmaster in 1998.

Track listing

Credits

Insane Clown Posse
 Violent J – vocals
 2 Dope – vocals; turntables

Additional personell
 Jumpsteady – guest vocals
 Capitol E – guest vocals
 Mike E. Clark – turntables, production

Certifications

References

1994 albums
Albums produced by Mike E. Clark
Insane Clown Posse albums
Island Records albums
Self-released albums
Psychopathic Records albums
Horrorcore albums